Malcolm Xavier Griffin (born August 10, 1991) is an American professional basketball player for SLAC of the Basketball Africa League (BAL). Standing at 1.93 m (6'4"), he plays at the point guard and shooting guard positions. After two years at Toledo and two years at Fresno Pacific he played professional basketball in Morocco, Tunisia, Latvia, Greece, Russia and Israel.

High school career
Griffin played high school basketball at Hyde Park Career Academy at Chicago, Illinois. He led his team to a 27–5 mark as a senior and averaging 17 points, seven assists and five rebounds per game. Griffin also earned South MVP honors in the Chicago Classic All-Star Game, scoring 28 points in just 13 minutes of action.

College career
After graduating from high school, Griffin attended Toledo, where he stayed until 2011. As a freshman, he averaged 7.1 points, 3.2 rebounds and 2.9 assists per game. As a sophomore, he started 28 games for the Rockets, averaging 12.0 points, 4.0 assists, 2.6 rebounds and 1.4 steals per game while scoring in double figures against two ranked opponents, Illinois and Temple. He scored a career-high 31 points against Northern Illinois and had back-to-back 25-point games against Ball State and Bowling Green. The next two years, Griffin played at Fresno Pacific. As a Junior, he played in 30 games, making 29 starts for the Sunbirds, earning 1st team NCCAA All-American and 1st team All-PacWest honors. He finished fourth in the league in scoring and led the PacWest in assists. As a senior he was a 1st team All-American and All-Conference once again, leading the Pacific West Conference in points, assists and steals.

Professional career
After going undrafted in the 2014 NBA draft, Griffin joined Wydad Athletic Club Casablanca at Morocco. The same season, he also played for Champaign Swarm of the Midwest Professional Basketball Association. The following season, he returned to Morocco and played with Fath US de Rabat. 

The next year, Griffin joined AS Salé at Tunisia. In December 2016, he left the team in order to join Liepājas Lauvas of the Latvian League. He led the Latvian league in assists, and was also named the Latvian Import Player of the Year, and Baltic League Defensive Player of the Year by the Eurobasket.com website.

On August 3, 2017, Griffin signed with Kolossos Rodou of the Greek Basket League. On October 16, 2017, he was voted as the Greek League MVP of the week after having 30 points and 4 assists against Panionios. The player also had 20 points in a near victory against former Greek League Champion Panathinaikos Superfoods. After leading the Greek League in scoring, and being third in assist and sixth in steals on January 22, 2018, Griffin was bought out from his Greek team by the VTB United League club Zenit Saint Petersburg of Russia. He signed a contract with Zenit for the rest of the 2017–18 season.

On July 17, 2018, Griffin returned to Greece and joined AEK Athens of the Greek Basket League. On December 11, 2018, Griffin recorded a season-high 25 points, shooting 11-of-14 from the field, along with seven rebounds and four assists in a 83–70 win over Hapoel Jerusalem. He was named Basketball Champions League Game Day 8 MVP. Griffin won the 2019 FIBA Intercontinental Cup with AEK.

On April 27, 2019, Griffin parted ways with AEK to join Hapoel Jerusalem of the Israeli Premier League for the rest of the season.

On August 1, 2019, Griffin signed a one-year deal with Hapoel Tel Aviv. On October 31, 2019, he parted ways with Hapoel after appearing in three league games. 

On December 3, 2019, Griffin, in a surprise move, returned to Greece for Kolossos Rodou. On July 23, 2020, Griffin moved on to PAOK Thessaloniki, his third Greek club. On July 15, 2021, he officially renewed his contract with PAOK. On January 26, 2022, Griffin mutually parted ways with the club, after suffering a season-ending injury.

In May 2022, he joined SLAC from Guinea to play in the playoffs of the Basketball Africa League (BAL).

Career statistics

Domestic Leagues

Regular season

|-
| 2017–18
| style="text-align:left;"| Kolossos Rodou
| align=center | GBL
| 13 || 27.3 || .506 || .325 || .813 || 3.8 || 5.0 || 1.5 || 0 || 15.9
|-
| 2018–19
| style="text-align:left;"| A.E.K.
| align=center | GBL
| 25 || 20.4 || .487 || .313 || .667 || 1.8 || 3.0 || 1.1 || 0 || 7.5
|}

FIBA Champions League

|-
| style="text-align:left;" | 2018–19
| style="text-align:left;" | A.E.K.
| 18 || 22.8 || .413 || .288 || .875 || 2.6 || 2.0 || 1.1 || 0 || 8.3
|}

References

External links 
EuroCup Profile
Eurobasket.com Profile
RealGM profile
Fresno Pacific College Profile

1991 births
Living people
AEK B.C. players
AS Salé (basketball) players
American expatriate basketball people in Greece
American expatriate basketball people in Israel
American expatriate basketball people in Latvia
American expatriate basketball people in Morocco
American expatriate basketball people in Russia
American men's basketball players
Basketball players from Chicago
BC Zenit Saint Petersburg players
BK Liepājas Lauvas players
Fresno Pacific Sunbirds men's basketball players
Hapoel Jerusalem B.C. players
Hapoel Tel Aviv B.C. players
Kolossos Rodou B.C. players
P.A.O.K. BC players
Point guards
Shooting guards
SLAC basketball players
Toledo Rockets men's basketball players